John Roosevelt Comeaux (September 15, 1943 in Lafayette, Louisiana) is an American retired professional basketball player who spent one season in the American Basketball Association (ABA) as a member of the New Orleans Buccaneers during the 1967–68 season. He attended Grambling State University where he was selected during the seventh round of the 1966 NBA draft by the Chicago Bulls, but he did not sign.

External links
 

1943 births
Living people
American men's basketball players
Basketball players from Louisiana
Chicago Bulls draft picks
Forwards (basketball)
Grambling State Tigers men's basketball players
New Orleans Buccaneers players
Sportspeople from Lafayette, Louisiana